Easypose is an American fitness startup based in Los Angeles and founded by Ruben Dua and Venk Tatineni. The company offers a platform to book a certified yoga teacher for a home, office or hotel yoga session in 20+ American cities. Prior to founding the company, Dua was the CEO of an advertising technology company known as Spreeify and is a graduate of USC and LMU.

History
The company was initially founded as a general marketplace for local freelancers known as Dubb. The company rebranded to Easypose and focused on the yoga market due to significant interest in the Los Angeles metro, San Francisco Bay area and New York metro.

Founders 

Ruben Dua is the CEO and co-founder of Easypose, an on-demand yoga service that lets users book a certified yoga teacher to their home, office or hotel for a personalized yoga class. Ruben Dua grew up in the San Fernando Valley in Los Angeles, California. In 1999 he graduated from USC with a degree in media studies (with a dissertation in corporate communications in Spanish). In 2007 he graduated from LMU with a Masters in Business Administration.

Company 
Easypose is a mobile app platform that lets you book a certified yoga teacher to your home or office. The company has 1K+ teachers in their network and available in 20+ cities. Easypose disrupts the $27B yoga market  by connecting the 70K yoga teachers in the U.S. to the 36 million people  who do yoga with a personalized, safe and seamless in home/office yoga experience.

References 

Companies based in Los Angeles
Online companies of the United States
Privately held companies of the United States